Judge Owens (1916–2001) was an American Negro league infielder. Judge Owens may also refer to:

John B. Owens (born 1971), judge of the United States Court of Appeals for the Ninth Circuit
Richard Owen (judge) (1922–2015), judge of the United States District Court for the Southern District of New York
Wilbur Dawson Owens Jr. (1930–2010), judge of the United States District Court for the Middle District of Georgia